The V 42 was a one off, single-engine, two-seat sports monoplane, built in Germany in 1925.

Design and development
Broadly similar to but larger and nearly 30% heavier than the LFG V 40 and LFG V 44, the V 42 was an all-metal cantilever high-wing monoplane.  Unlike the V 40 and V 44 it was powered by an inline engine rather than a radial, the  Mercedes D.I.

Operational history
The V 42 was amongst five LFG entries to the Round Germany Flight held in the summer of 1925, though only the LFG V 39 took take part.

Specifications

References

1920s German sport aircraft
LFG V 42
Single-engined tractor aircraft
High-wing aircraft
Aircraft first flown in 1925